Hsieh Su-wei was the defending champion, but she lost in the quarterfinals to Bethanie Mattek-Sands. Karolína Plíšková defeated Mattek-Sands in the final, 1–6, 7–5, 6–3, to claim her first WTA singles title.

Seeds

Draw

Finals

Top half

Bottom half

Qualifying

Seeds

Qualifiers

Draw

First qualifier

Second qualifier

Third qualifier

Fourth qualifier

Fifth qualifier

Sixth qualifier

References
Main Draw
Qualifying Draw

Malaysian Open
Malaysian Open (tennis)